Refer or referral may refer to:
Reference, a relation of designation or linking between objects
Word-sense disambiguation, when a single term may refer to multiple meanings
Referral marketing, to personally recommend, endorse, and pass a person to a qualified professional or service
Referral (medicine), to transfer a patient's care from one clinician to another
Commit (motion), a motion in parliamentary procedure
Refer (software), the tr-off preprocessor for citations
Rede Ferroviária Nacional, the Portuguese rail network manager
Referral, a form of instant replay in cricket
Criminal referral, a document recommending investigation of crimes to the appropriate authority
HTTP referer, the address of the webpage of the resource which links to an internet webpage or resource

See also
Referee (disambiguation)
Reference (disambiguation)
Referent
Reefer (disambiguation)